Ivanjohnstonia is a monotypic genus of flowering plants belonging to the family Boraginaceae. The only species is Ivanjohnstonia jaunsariensis 

Its native range is the Western Himalaya.

The genus name of Ivanjohnstonia is in honour of Ivan Murray Johnston (1898–1960), an American botanist. and the Latin specific epithet of jaunsariensis refers to the Jaunsar-Bawar region in northern India.
Both genus and species were first described and published in Sultania Vol.1 on page 1 in 1975.

References

Boraginoideae
Boraginaceae genera
Monotypic asterid genera
Plants described in 1845
Flora of West Himalaya